NGC 274 is a lenticular galaxy in the constellation Cetus. It is a pair of galaxies, the other being NGC 275, which it is currently interacting with. It was discovered on September 10, 1785 by William Herschel. It is roughly 120 million light-years away.

References

External links

Type II supernova 2018cdc in NGC 274

140
0274
17850910
Cetus (constellation)
Lenticular galaxies
Interacting galaxies
002980
Discoveries by William Herschel